The Sheffield and Hallamshire Football Association is a County Football Association in England. It was formed in Sheffield in 1867 as the Sheffield Football Association, and is the second-oldest football governing body after the Football Association (FA). Its teams adopted the Sheffield Rules of football until 1878, when they were merged with the FA's rules. Its members include the two oldest football clubs in the world, Sheffield and Hallam.

Today, the County FA is responsible for the administration, control, promotion and development of grass-roots football within a 20-mile radius of Sheffield Cathedral. This covers almost all of South Yorkshire (excluding only the area around Askern, Hatfield and Thorne) as well as parts of North Derbyshire (e.g. Dronfield), North Nottinghamshire (e.g. Worksop), and southern parts of West Yorkshire (e.g. Emley, Hemsworth).

History

Organised football started in Sheffield in 1857 with the birth of Sheffield Football Club and the creation of Sheffield Rules. By the early 1860s there were over 15 clubs in the Sheffield area and they were the first to start inter-club games. This was done with no formal body in overall control with Sheffield Rules used by the majority of clubs.

The Sheffield Football Association was founded by the end of January 1867, with Harry Chambers, secretary of Sheffield FC, serving as its first President. It claimed membership of 14 clubs, representing over 1,000 members. The Association issued its first set of rules on 6 March 1867, basing them on the FA's rules which had been formulated in February of the same year.

Although the Youdan Cup took place between February and March 1867, and was competed for by most of the Association's member clubs, it was organized by a separate committee and was unable to use the Sheffield FA's rules, since they were not issued until the day after the Cup's final. A second cup, the Cromwell Cup, was played the next year under the auspices of the Sheffield Association. It was only open to teams under two years old, and was won by The Wednesday.

On 2 December 1871, played the first inter-association game with the London Association, beating them 3–1 at Bramall Lane. Despite losing the game, the London Association (now known as the F.A.) became the primary association which led to the national adoption of the London rules. However, the Sheffield Association continued to have some influence and on 17 February 1872 proposed Rule VII introducing the corner-kick to the Association Rules.

Over the next few years, matches against the associations of Birmingham, Glasgow, North Wales, Manchester and Staffordshire were arranged. Other non-association friendlies were played notably against the Wanderers, the Swifts and the Royal Engineers.

The first annual competition, the Sheffield Association Challenge Cup, was introduced in the 1876–77 season. This was joined by the Wharncliffe Charity Cup two years later. Both were won by Wednesday, who had become the dominant force in local football, in their first year.

The creep of professionalism began in 1876 when Wednesday brought down James Lang from Glasgow. He was officially hired by the club but received a job with no formal duties from one of the members of the club board. The association subsequently had to deal with open professionalism when members of The Zulus received payment for matches. A number of players were banned, so many in fact that it led to the abandonment of the 1882 Sheffield Challenge Cup final. In 1885, professionalism was made legal but the Sheffield Association, led by Charles Clegg and William Peirce Dix remained firm opponents of professionalism in football.

In 1877, a rival association given the name Sheffield New was established in protest of Sheffield FA's decision not to allow any club under two years old to become a member. It later changed its name to Hallamshire Football Association. This situation persisted until the end of the 1886–87 season when a merger of the two associations was negotiated by Clegg who took charge of the new association with Dix employed as secretary.

The clubs of the Sheffield F.A. of 1877 were Albion, Artillery and Hallamshire Rifles, Attercliffe, Brightside, Brincliffe, Broomhall, Crookes, Exchange, Exchange Brewery, Fir Vale, Gleadless, Hallam, Heeley, Kimberworth, Millhouses, Norfolk, Norfolk Works, Owlerton, Oxford, Parkwood Springs, Philadelphia, Rotherham, Sheffield, Surrey, Thursday Wanderers, Wednesday.

Competitions

Men's
Sheffield & Hallamshire County Senior League (levels 11-13)
Sheffield & Hallamshire Senior Cup (clubs at levels 5-11)
Sheffield & Hallamshire Association Cup (clubs at levels 12-14)
Sheffield & Hallamshire Junior Cup (clubs at levels 15-)

Women's
Sheffield & Hallamshire Women's County League (clubs at levels 7-9)
Sheffield & Hallamshire Women's Challenge Cup (clubs at levels 1-7)

Affiliated clubs
Unlike most County FA's, which cover a historic county of England, teams are affiliated to the S&HCFA if they are located within a 20-mile radius of Sheffield Cathedral, although this rule is not set in stone. Hundreds of football clubs are affiliated to the association.

As of 2022/23, the following S&HCFA-affiliated clubs compete in senior men's and women's football (not including reserve teams) -

Men's teams

Women's teams

Representative teams

The Sheffield & Hallamshire FA formerly ran the Sheffield representative team that was active from the earliest days of the game in the 1860s, playing against select teams from cities such as London and Glasgow, the series against the latter running from 1874 to 1960.

Since 1944 an U18 side has represented the Sheffield & Hallamshire FA in the FA County Youth Cup, winning the competition in 1953 and 1964.

References

External links 

County football associations
Sport in Sheffield
1867 establishments in England
Sports organizations established in 1867
Organisations based in Sheffield